Gibberula elisae is a species of very small sea snail, a marine gastropod mollusc or micromollusc in the family Cystiscidae.

Description
The length of the shell attains 3.05 mm

Distribution
This marine species occurs off Madagascar.

References

 Bozzetti L. & Cossignani T. (2009). Una nuova Gibberula dal Madagascar (Gastropoda: Prosobranchia, Cystiscidae). Malacologia Mostra Mondiale 64: 33

External links

elisae
Gastropods described in 2009